Roman Datsiuk (born September 7, 1988) is a Ukrainian footballer.

Playing career 
Datsiuk played in the Ukrainian Football Amateur League in 2007 with FC Horizon Kostopil. In 2011, he played in the Ukrainian Second League with FC Slavutych Cherkasy. In 2014, he signed with FC Stal Dniprodzerzhynsk in the Ukrainian First League. Throughout his time in the Ukrainian First League he played with FC Hirnyk Kryvyi Rih, FSC Bukovyna Chernivtsi, and FC Ternopil. In 2018, he went abroad to play in the Canadian Soccer League with FC Ukraine United, where he won the First Division title.

After a season abroad he returned to the Ukrainian Football Amateur League to play with FC Malynsk. Later in 2019 Datsiuk played for Svitanok-Agrosvit Shlyakhova. In 2020, he played for Nyva Terebovlya. He left in April 2021 He then had a spell at Votrans Lutsk before returning to Nyva Terebovlya later in 2021.

Honors

FC Ukraine United 
 Canadian Soccer League First Division (1): 2018

References 

1988 births
Living people
Ukrainian footballers
FC Cherkashchyna players
FC Stal Kamianske players
FC Hirnyk Kryvyi Rih players
FC Bukovyna Chernivtsi players
FC Ternopil players
FC Ukraine United players
Ukrainian First League players
Canadian Soccer League (1998–present) players
Association football midfielders
Ukrainian Second League players